Ringgold High School, part of the Ringgold School District, is a public high school in Carroll Township, Washington County, Pennsylvania, which is about thirty miles south of Pittsburgh.  The Ringgold School District was formed as a result of the merger of the Donora and Monongahela School Districts. 

Mascot: Ram
Colors: Blue & Gold

Athletics 
Ringgold High School has sixteen varsity sports teams and competes as The Ringgold Rams in the Western Pennsylvania Interscholastic Athletic League.

State Championship Titles 
Ringgold currently holds two state championship titles. The first PIAA Class 4A title was won by the 1994-5 Ringgold Boys Basketball team. The basketball team beat Williamsport in a 71-66 game. The second was won by the 2018 Ringgold Boys Baseball team. The 2018 Rams beat their opponent, Valley View, in a 6-4 win.

Notable alumni
 Fred Cox (1938-2019), former NFL kicker, (attended Monongahela High School before merger)
 Ken Griffey Sr. (born 1950), former MLB outfielder and coach, (attended Donora High School before merger)
 Joe Montana (born 1956), former NFL quarterback, member of Pro Football Hall of Fame
 Stan Musial (1920-2013), former MLB outfielder and pitcher, (attended Donora High School before merger)
 Anthony Peterson (born 1972), former NFL linebacker
 Jim Renacci (born 1958), member of the US House of Representatives
 Scott Zolak (born 1967), broadcaster and former NFL quarterback

References

External links
Ringgold High School

Public high schools in Pennsylvania
Schools in Washington County, Pennsylvania
Education in Pittsburgh area